Antonio Carratoni (born 8 November 1945) became Captain Regent of San Marino on 1 October 2006 along with Roberto Giorgetti. He held that office until 1 April 2007. Carattoni is a member of the Party of Socialists and Democrats.

References

1945 births
Living people
Captains Regent of San Marino
Members of the Grand and General Council
Party of Socialists and Democrats politicians